The Algerian Basketball Cup is an elimination Basketball tournament held annually in Algeria. It is the second most important national title in Algerian basketball after the Algerian Basketball Championship. The competition started apparently in 1968.

Finals

Rq
MC Alger (ex. MP Alger & GS Pétroliers)
MC Oran (ex. MP Oran)
OC Alger (ex. CS DNC Alger & IRB Alger)
RC Kouba (ex. NAR Alger)
NA Hussein Dey (ex. MA Hussein Dey)
WA Boufarik (ex. WO Boufarik)
NB Staouéli (ex. CR Staouéli & DRB Staouéli)

Most successful clubs

See also
 Algerian Basketball Championship
 Algerian Women's Basketball Cup

External links
 Algerian Basketball Cup history - basketalgerie.com

 
Basketball competitions  in Algeria
Algeria